Denis Chassé (born February 7, 1970) is a Canadian former professional ice hockey player. He played in the NHL for the St. Louis Blues, Washington Capitals, Winnipeg Jets and Ottawa Senators. He played right wing and shot right-handed.

Playing career
As a youth, Chassé played in the 1983 Quebec International Pee-Wee Hockey Tournament with a minor ice hockey team from Mercier, Quebec.

Chassé began his career playing in the QMJHL. While there he established himself as a high scoring forward as well as a rugged enforcer. In his final year in the QMJHL he scored 101 points in 62 games in addition to logging 246 penalty minutes.

Chassé signed as a free agent with the Quebec Nordiques in 1991. From there he reported to the Halifax Citadels of the AHL. He played two solid years with the Citadels, scoring 61 and 76 points respectively. For the 1993–1994 season Chassé joined the Cornwall Aces and scored 66 points in 48 games. Midway through the 1993–1994 season he was traded to the St. Louis Blues and made his NHL debut with the Blues towards the end of the season, appearing in 3 games.

Chassé earned a full-time spot with the Blues for the 1994–1995 lockout shortened season. He played in 47 games, scoring 16 points. He also surprised many with his play in the playoffs that year, scoring 8 points in 7 games. The 1995–1996 season was a rough one for Chassé. He played for 3 teams, playing 42 games with the Blues, 3 with the Washington Capitals, and 15 with the Winnipeg Jets while only scoring 3 points the whole year.

Chassé signed as a free agent with the Ottawa Senators for the 1996–1997 season. He played 22 games in what would be his last stint in the NHL. Chassé then played the next 4 years in Europe, beginning with a season in the Deutsche Eishockey Liga in Germany, splitting the season with the Adler Mannheim and the Augsburger Panther.  He then spent three seasons in the United Kingdom playing in the now defunct Ice Hockey Superleague, spending two seasons with the Bracknell Bees and one with the Cardiff Devils before retiring in 2001.

Personal life
Denis Chassé is married to Carolee (Doyle) Chassé. Together, they have three children. Dayne Chassé (1999–present), Anika Chassé (2001–present), and Blake Chassé (2002–present). He is now working in Halifax, Nova Scotia, Canada for Allstate insurance.

Career statistics

Regular season and playoffs

References

External links

1970 births
Adler Mannheim players
Augsburger Panther players
Bracknell Bees players
Canadian ice hockey right wingers
Cardiff Devils players
Chicoutimi Saguenéens (QMJHL) players
Cornwall Aces players
Detroit Vipers players
Drummondville Voltigeurs players
French Quebecers
Halifax Citadels players
Saint-Jean Castors players
Ice hockey people from Montreal
Indianapolis Ice players
Living people
Ottawa Senators players
St. Louis Blues players
Undrafted National Hockey League players
Verdun Junior Canadiens players
Washington Capitals players
Winnipeg Jets (1979–1996) players
Worcester IceCats players
Canadian expatriate ice hockey players in England
Canadian expatriate ice hockey players in Wales
Canadian expatriate ice hockey players in Germany
Canadian expatriate ice hockey players in the United States